Nemanja Mijušković (born 4 March 1992) is a Montenegrin professional footballer who plays as a centre-back for Polish club Miedź Legnica.

Club career
Born in Podgorica, Mijušković started his career with local side FK Budućnost Podgorica, although he would never make an appearance for the first team.  He moved to Serbia to join the youth team of OFK Beograd in 2008. Mijušjović would be signed to the senior team in 2009, although he would never play in a first team match. In February 2010 he was part of FK Jedinstvo Ub squad at the 2010 Torneo di Viareggio. By the end of the 2009–10 winter break, Russian side FC Dynamo Moscow bought Mijušković from OFK Beograd. He stayed in Russia until the summer of 2012, appearing for the reserve team of Dynamo Moscow and going on loan to the reserve team of FC Amkar Perm. For the 2012–13 season, Mijušković moved to FK Sarajevo in the Premier League of Bosnia and Herzegovina, where he would make his senior debut. In the summer of 2013 he returned to Montenegro and joined with FK Rudar Pljevlja, playing with the club for two seasons in the Montenegrin First League. He would make more than 50 appearances and score four times for Rudar. In the summer of 2015, he left Montenegro to sign with Macedonian side FK Vardar. He left the club at the end of 2016.

On 1 January 2018, he signed a 2-year contract with the Russian Premier League club FC Tosno.

International career
Mijušković made his debut for Montenegro in a May 2016 friendly match against Turkey and has, as of September 2020, earned a total of 4 caps, scoring no goals.

Career statistics

Notes

Honours
Rudar Pljevlja
Montenegrin First League: 2014–15

Vardar
Macedonian First League: 2015–16, 2016–17

Tosno
Russian Cup: 2017–18

Miedź Legnica
I liga: 2021–22

References

1992 births
Living people
Footballers from Podgorica
Association football central defenders
Montenegrin footballers
Montenegro youth international footballers
Montenegro international footballers
FK Budućnost Podgorica players
FK Jedinstvo Ub players
OFK Beograd players
FC Dynamo Moscow players
FC Amkar Perm players
FK Sarajevo players
FK Rudar Pljevlja players
FK Vardar players
FC Taraz players
FC Tosno players
FC Hermannstadt players
Miedź Legnica players
Premier League of Bosnia and Herzegovina players
Montenegrin First League players
Macedonian First Football League players
Kazakhstan Premier League players
Russian Premier League players
Liga I players
I liga players
Ekstraklasa players
Montenegrin expatriate footballers
Montenegrin expatriate sportspeople in Serbia
Expatriate footballers in Serbia
Montenegrin expatriate sportspeople in Russia
Expatriate footballers in Russia
Montenegrin expatriate sportspeople in Bosnia and Herzegovina
Expatriate footballers in Bosnia and Herzegovina
Montenegrin expatriate sportspeople in North Macedonia
Expatriate footballers in North Macedonia
Montenegrin expatriate sportspeople in Kazakhstan
Expatriate footballers in Kazakhstan
Montenegrin expatriate sportspeople in Romania
Expatriate footballers in Romania
Montenegrin expatriate sportspeople in Poland
Expatriate footballers in Poland